The Men's 200 metre backstroke competition of the 2020 European Aquatics Championships was held on 21 and 22 May 2021.

Records
Prior the competition, the existing world, European and championship records were as follows.

Results

Heats
The heats were started on 21 May 2021 at 10:47.

Swim-off
The swim-off was held on 21 May at 12:15.

Semifinals
The semifinals were held on 21 May at 18:30.

Semifinal 1

Semifinal 2

Final
The final was held on 22 May at 19:17.

References

External links

Men's 200 metre backstroke